The Guldbagge Honorary Award, instituted in 2000 for the 36th Guldbagge Awards, is a Lifetime achievement Award presented annually by the Swedish Film Institute (SFI) as part of the Guldbagge Awards (Swedish: "Guldbaggen") to people working in the Swedish motion picture industry.

Recipients

2000s

2010s

2020s

See also 
 Guldbagge Awards
 Academy Honorary Award
 Ingmar Bergman Award
 Cecil B. DeMille Award

References

External links 
  
  
 

Honorary Award
Lifetime achievement awards